Tiziana Rivale (born Letizia Oliva on 13 August 1958) is an Italian singer primarily associated with the Italo disco style. In 1983, she won the Sanremo Music Festival with the song "Sarà quel che sarà".

Life and career 
Letizia Olivia was born in Formia, Italy, where by the age of eleven she had become determined to pursue a musical career. After being a vocalist in the musical group Rockollection, in 1980 Oliva debuted as a solo singer under the stage name Tiziana Ciao. After signing under contract with WEA Italiana, she adopted her career-long stage name Tiziana Rivale (occasionally shortened to just Rivale for releases) and released her debut single under this name, "L'amore va". A self-trained vocalist, around the same time she had been recording television jingles with other artists, including Ivana Spagna and Ronnie Jones.

In 1983, Rivale won a selection organized by Domenica in that put up for grabs a place in the 32nd edition of the Sanremo Music Festival, and eventually won the main competition with the song "Sarà quel che sarà". The song was also Rivale's biggest commercial success, remaining on the Italian music charts for twelve weeks and peaking at No. 5. Rivale would go on to gradually record and release three albums following the competition - the eponymous self-titled pop ballad-based Tiziana Rivale (1983) which also featured "Sarà quel che sarà", the synth-pop/Italo disco album Contatto (1986), and the Italo disco concept album Destiny (1988). Although she starred in a music video - her only one - for the titular track of Destiny, no commercial single was ever released. As the 1980s came to a close, Rivale gradually focused her attention on live musical performances, primarily performing in club venues and seldom making television appearances by the end of the decade as the popularity of the genre waned. Between 1988 and 1992 Rivale took a break from the music industry and moved to Los Angeles before moving back to Italy and resuming her musical career.

Following the release of the albums Con tutto l'amore che c'è (1996) and Angelo biondo (2000), as well as her sole compilation album Il meglio (1997), Rivale would then sign on with the retro label Flashback Records. Off her sixth studio album Mystic Rain (2009) the lead single "Ash" (2008) was well-received upon release, and has been regarded as one of the best Italo disco songs in recent years. Rivale released two additional studio albums under similar retro labels, True (2011) and the multi-language Babylon 2015 (2015); while none of these new albums managed to chart, they were made widely available as her older albums became more widely re-released and internationally distributed.

Rivale continues to perform in Italian retro club venues as well as record new material.

Discography

Singles 
"L'amore va" (1983) - Italy #76
"Sarà quel che sarà" / "Serenade" (1983) - Italy #5
"Questo mondo è una baracca" (1983)
"C'est la vie" (1984) - Italy #115
"Ferma il mondo" / "Moviestory" (1985)
"È finita qui" (1994)
"Ash" / "Flame" (2008) - Italy #208
"Telephone" / "Daily Dream" (2009)
"For Always" (2014)

Albums 
Tiziana Rivale (1983) - Italy #38
Contatto (1986) - Italy #80
Destiny (1988) (as Rivale) - Italy #123
Con tutto l'amore che c'è (1996) (as Rivale)
Angelo biondo (2000)
Mystic Rain (2009) (as Rivale)
 True (2011)
 Babylon 2015 (2015)

Compilations 

 Il meglio (1997) - Italy #98

All albums and single releases credited as Tiziana Rivale unless otherwise stated.

References

External links 
 

Italian pop singers
1958 births
Living people
Sanremo Music Festival winners
20th-century Italian composers
20th-century Italian women musicians
20th-century Italian singers
Italo disco musicians
Italian women singers
Italian women
Italian women musicians
People from the Province of Latina
21st-century Italian composers
21st-century Italian women musicians
21st-century Italian singers